Adam Patrick Kimber SC (1969) is a judge of the South Australian District Court, formerly a prominent South Australian criminal barrister. He was the Director of Public Prosecutions of South Australia between 2012 and 2019.

Education & Career 
Kimber was educated at Saint Ignatius' College, Adelaide where he completed matriculation in 1986 with a score "in the high 400s". The next year he commenced an Arts/Law degree at the University of Adelaide, graduating from the Law School in 1993 with a LLB (Hons).

Following graduation, he spent 15 months working as an associate to Chief Justice Len King until April, 1995. Whilst working at Wallmans solicitors, he was approached by Paul Rofe to join the Office of the Director of Public Prosecutions. Rofe said he had poached Kimber because he had recognised his potential while he was Chief Justice King's associate.

Personal life 
Kimber was an excellent grade cricketer, captaining the Adelaide University Cricket Club. During the 16 years he played for the club, he won three A grade premierships. During this time he also played two matches for South Australia where he was the 538th person to represent the state.

Adam still enjoys a close relationship with the Adelaide University Cricket Club as its president.

References 

Australian barristers
Australian cricketers
1969 births
Living people